José Llanusa (11 August 1925 – 14 July 2007) was a Cuban basketball player. He competed in the men's tournament at the 1948 Summer Olympics.

References

1925 births
2007 deaths
Cuban men's basketball players
Olympic basketball players of Cuba
Basketball players at the 1948 Summer Olympics
Basketball players from Havana